The 1947–48 BAA season was the Bombers' 2nd season in the BAA (which later became the NBA).

Draft

Roster

Regular season

Season standings

Record vs. opponents

Game log

Playoffs

Semifinals
(W1) St. Louis Bombers vs. (E1) Philadelphia Warriors: Warriors win series 4-3
Game 1 @ St. Louis (March 23): St. Louis 60, Philadelphia 58
Game 2 @ St. Louis (March 25): Philadelphia 65, St. Louis 64
Game 3 @ Philadelphia (March 27): Philadelphia 84, St. Louis 56
Game 4 @ Philadelphia (March 30): St. Louis 56, Philadelphia 51
Game 5 @ St. Louis (April 1): St. Louis 69, Philadelphia 62
Game 6 @ Philadelphia (April 3): Philadelphia 84, St. Louis 61
Game 7 @ St. Louis (April 6): Philadelphia 85, St. Louis 46

References 

St. Louis Bombers (NBA) seasons
St. Louis